The Operational Command for the Restoration of Security and Order, or Kopkamtib, was a military body established to deal with the 1965 coup attempt operation in Indonesia, and was subsequently used by President Suharto's New Order regime to suppress dissent.

Origins of Kopkamtib
Kopkamtib was established on 10 October 1965, ten days after the 30 September Movement killed six senior army generals in a failed coup attempt. Surviving general, Suharto, accepted President Sukarno's order to take control of the army on condition that he be handed full authority to restore order and security, an arrangement that was formalised by creating Kopkamtib.

The conflict between the forces of the military and their rivals the Communist Party of Indonesia (PKI), had predated the setting up of the organisation. The formation of Kopkamtib was a legitimisation of military and the New Order governments determination to organise the liquidation of  the  PKI and its related organisations.

By 1968 the PKI was no longer seen as a credible threat to military power, Kopkamtib's role as the New Order's main security apparatus remained, as did its surveillance of citizens. Kopkamtib played and important role in ensuring Golkar victory in the 1971 general elections. The organisation screened candidates and disqualifying about 20 per cent for political reasons.

Established immediately after the events of the 30 September Movement.It can be said that this institution was an instrument of Suharto's New Order power that coordinated a number of intelligence agencies, from Bakin to intelligence in every part of ABRI. In fact, in cases deemed to be disruptive to political and economic stability, Kopkamtib was able to break through the authority of the civilian department, even though ABRI's authority.  By employing trusted military personnel to carry out tasks with political objectives in a broad and extraordinary sense, the Kopkamtib is at the core of the Indonesian government during a period of permanent martial law.

Without control 
In 1974 the president took over Kopkamtib as an organization under the government by issuing Presidential Decree No. 9/1974.  Even in 1982, Kopkamtib had become a military institution that was completely out of control by the community by not mentioning the institution in the Defense and Security Law that was being drafted DPR.

23 years in power 
During the 23 years of the New Order government, Kopkamtib has been the military government's task force to carry out security and intelligence activities.  Through this series of activities, Kopkamtib was able to use all assets and personnel of the civil administration in Indonesia in the interests of the so-called New Order government as maintaining the implementation of development based on Pancasila and Constitution of Indonesia.

Legal basis

Supersemar 
Based on the law, the Kopkamtib was recorded as having the first legal basis through the Sebelas Maret Order (Supersemar) in the form of a presidential order from Sukarno to  Major General Suharto to take steps deemed necessary to ensure the stability of national security.

TAP MPR 
In March 1973, the  MPR issued TAP MPR No.X / MPR / 1973 regarding Kopkamtib Regulations and Functions in the National Security System which gave power to the president as the MPR mandate to take steps that were  necessary for the success of guarding national development based on Pancasila democracy and the 1945 Constitution by:
 Maintain national security,
 Maintaining the unity and integrity of the nation,
 Preventing the rise of the  G30S / PKI movement and other threats of subversion.

Functions and powers

Functions 
Prior to its dissolution, Kopkamtib in accordance with Presidential Decree No.47 / 1978 had 4 main functions:
 Coordinating the implementation of policies in maintaining the stability of national security and order.
 Prevent activities and eradicate the remnants of the G30S / PKI, subversion and other extreme groups that threaten public security and order that endanger the safety and integrity of the state, a nation based on Pancasila and the 1945 Constitution.
 Preventing the moral and mental influences caused by the G30S PKI and other cultural currents that are contrary to moral, mental and cultural based on Pancasila.
 Guide the community to be more active in participating and taking responsibility in maintaining security and order.

Emergency security agency 
In the legal and organizational discourse, Kopkamtib was directed to become a military security agency on an emergency basis, starting with the promulgation of the subversion law of 1957.  The structure in this law which later inspired the birth of Keppress No.47 / 1978 concerning the Kopkamtib organization which had a Laksusda at the Kodam and Laksuswil at the Kowilhan level until September 1988 was replaced by Bakorstanas.

Power 
As coordinator of government security policies, Kopkamtib has become part of the existing regulations in the country.  This fact is shown by the use of all state instruments and elements of the state apparatus as well as making all measurements by referring to legal decisions that are reflected in the security law based on Pancasila and the 1945 Constitution. Kopkamtib as previously acknowledged General police Hoegeng Imam Santoso, has the power to give orders to the police in carrying out the process of interrogation, arrest, detention which is not regulated in existing national regulations.

Later and post Suharto era
In September 1988, Suharto closed down the organisation. The succeeding organisation was Badan Koordinasi Bantuan Pemantapan Stabilitas Nasional (Bakorstanas) which lasted until March 2000, when it was dismantled by the government of the Reform era. Bakorstanas aimed to restore, maintain and enhance national stability, as well provide advice and was headed by the ABRI Commander who reported directly to the president. Even so, almost all Kopkamtib staff and all the roles played by previous organizations were also carried out by this new institute.

Deputy Commanders were also known as Chief of Staff of the organisation

Hierarchy 
Pangkopkamtib in carrying out their duties is accountable to the president.  But apart from that, in carrying out his daily duties, the Pangkopkamtib is responsible to Ministry of Defense (Indonesia) / Commander of the Indonesian National Armed Forces.  Between 1974 and 1983, the Pangkopkamtib structure was accompanied by the Chief of Staff (Kaskopkamtib) and his personal secretary (Spri Kaskopkamtib) whose staff line was in the auxiliary leadership echelon.

Hierarchically there are 6 major frameworks for implementing Kopkamtib policies, they are:
 President is in charge of all tasks and in special circumstances gives direct orders to the Laksusda through the Head of Police, Security and Security / Pangab.
 Ministry of Defense (Indonesia) / Commander of the Indonesian National Armed Forces. as the day-to-day controller and supervises the task of carrying out the work of Kopkamtib.
  'Pangkopkamtib'  is in charge of Determining general policies, controlling and making decisions about Kopkamtib security restoration operations.
  'Kaskopkamtib'  coordinates and supervises security restoration operations.
  'Laksuswil'  implements policies at the regional level whose duties are responsible to the Pangab and Pangkopkamtib.
  'Laksusda'  implements policies at the regional level whose implementation of duties is generally responsible to Pangkowilhan and specifically to the Pangkopkamtib, Pangab and the President.

Organization 
In the organizational structure of the Kopkamtib, the President together with the Pangkopkamtib, 5 central executive echelons (commander of the Intel task force, head of the public relations information service, and the transportation unit, Kateperpu and the head of the Kopkamtib central prosecutor's prosecutor team) Laksuswil and Laksusda are linked along the Command line.  Meanwhile, the Minister of Defense and Security together with Pangkopkamtib, Laksuswil and Laksusda are united with lines of control and supervision.

As for other things, including 5 executive echelons in direct coordination by Pangkopkamtib.
Kopkamtib according to Presidential Decree No.47 / 1978 has an organizational structure consisting of:
 Control Echelon (Ministry of Defense (Indonesia) / Commander of the Indonesian National Armed Forces),
 Lead Echelon (Pangkopkamtib),
 Assistant Leadership Echelon which consists of:
 Main supporting elements (Ministry of Defense (Indonesia) / Commander of the Indonesian National Armed Forces and Kaskopkamtib),
 Staff elements (general staff: Assospol, Assintel, Asops, Aster and Askamtibmas Kopkamtib and Special Staff: Dansatgas Intel, Kadispen Humas, Dan Satub, Kateperpu, Katodsapu, Spri Pangkopkamtib and Spri Kaskopkamtib)
 Service elements (Setkopkamtib and Paku Kopkamtib) and executing echelons are divided into two elements: Central Executive (Intel task force, Dispen Public Relations, relations unit, Teperpu, Kopkamtib central prosecutor's prosecutor team) and Regional Implementers (Laksuswil and Laksusda).

Commanders

Chiefs of staff/deputy commanders

See also
 Transition to the New Order
 New Order (Indonesia)

Notes

References

Further reading
 (1977) The role and function of KOPKAMTIB : (the Operational Command for the Restoration of Security and Order) in the national security system Jakarta : KOPKAMTIB, (9 page pamphlet)
 (In Indonesian) Sudomo  (1982) Kebijaksanaan Kopkamtib dalam penanggulangan ekstremitas kiri Laksamana TNI Sudomo Jakarta : Sekretariat Komando Operasi Pemulihan Keamanan dan Ketertiban, 1982.

Indonesian intelligence agencies
Defunct intelligence agencies
Transition to the New Order
New Order (Indonesia)